David Doak is a Northern Irish video game designer. Originally from Belfast, he later moved to England, where he studied at Oxford University on biochemistry specialty and worked as a research scientist.

Doak began his video game career working with Rare where he provided network support for Donkey Kong Country 3: Dixie Kong's Double Trouble! and helped develop the critically acclaimed GoldenEye 007 and Perfect Dark for the Nintendo 64. His facial likeness and name were used for a non-player character in GoldenEye 007, a scientist named Dr. Doak. Several of the guards also bear his likeness.

Doak and video game composer Graeme Norgate left Rare in 1998 to start Free Radical Design. From there he worked on the video game series TimeSplitters and two other video games called Haze and Second Sight.

Doak left Free Radical - now known as Deep Silver Dambuster Studios - in 2009 and set up his own Nottingham-based studio, Zinkyzonk, which would develop games for Facebook. The company evolved from his defunct studio Pumpkin Beach. Zinkyzonk released its first game, Gangsta Zombies, on 11 July 2010 in partnership with Jolt Online Gaming.  The company was dissolved in April 2013.

Since 2016, Doak lectures at Norwich University of the Arts.

On 19 May 2021, Deep Silver announced the reformation of Free Radical Design with David Doak and Steve Ellis as studio heads to make a new TimeSplitters game.

References

Living people
Alumni of the University of Oxford
British biochemists
Businesspeople from Belfast
Rare (company) people
Video game designers
Year of birth missing (living people)